Route 116 is an east/west highway on the south shore of the Saint Lawrence River in Quebec, Canada. Until the mid-1970s it was known as Route 9. Its eastern terminus is in Lévis at the junction of Route 132, and the western terminus is at the junction of Route 134 in Lemoyne part of a concurrency with Route 112 until Saint-Hubert just south of the Saint-Hubert Municipal Airport. The stretch between Lévis and Plessisville does not have much traffic, since Autoroute 20 is not that far from the highway. Between Plessisville and Richmond traffic is heavier as it passes bigger towns, and it is further away from Autoroute 20. From Richmond to Autoroute 20 (which it overlaps for 6 km), it is quiet again, before reaching Saint-Hyacinthe, where it becomes a busy four-lane separated highway, going through the growing "South Shore" suburbs of Montreal. From the junction of Autoroute 30 to its western terminus, it is a controlled-access Autoroute-grade expressway. This portion was once envisioned to be part of Autoroute 16. An unofficial extension of Route 116 as thought of by locals, from the western terminus follows the Route 134 limited access expressway to the Jacques Cartier Bridge.

Municipalities along Quebec 116

 Longueuil - (Lemoyne / Saint-Hubert)
 Saint-Bruno-de-Montarville
 Saint-Basile-le-Grand
 McMasterville
 Beloeil
 Mont-Saint-Hilaire
 Sainte-Madeleine
 Sainte-Marie-Madeleine
 Saint-Hyacinthe
 Saint-Simon
 Saint-Liboire
 Upton
 Acton Vale
 Sainte-Christine
 Durham-Sud
 Melbourne
 Richmond
 Cleveland
 Danville
 Kingsey Falls
 Warwick
 Saint-Christophe-d'Arthabaska
 Victoriaville
 Princeville
 Plessisville
 Laurierville
 Lyster
 Dosquet
 Saint-Agapit
 Saint-Gilles
 Lévis - (Saint-Étienne-de-Lauzon / Saint-Rédempteur / Saint-Nicolas)

See also
 List of Quebec provincial highways

References

External links  
 Interactive Provincial Route Map (Transports Québec) 
 Highway 116 at motorways-exits.com
 Route 116 on Google Maps

116
Roads in Longueuil
Transport in Lévis, Quebec
Transport in Saint-Hyacinthe
Transport in Victoriaville